This is a listing of the horses that finished in either first, second, or third place and the number of starters in the Skipat Stakes, an American stakes race for fillies and mares three years old and older at 6 furlongs on the dirt held at Pimlico Race Course in Baltimore, Maryland.  (List 1993-present)

See also 
 List of graded stakes at Pimlico Race Course

References

Pimlico Race Course